The Spink County Courthouse, located at 210 E. Seventh Ave. in Redfield in Spink County, South Dakota is a historic courthouse built in 1927.  It was listed on the National Register of Historic Places in 2001.

It was designed by architect Beaver Wade Day of Toltz, King & Day Inc. and was built by Standard Construction Co.

References

Courthouses on the National Register of Historic Places in South Dakota
Neoclassical architecture in South Dakota
Government buildings completed in 1927
Spink County, South Dakota